Fortnite Creative is a sandbox game, developed and published by Epic Games, part of the video game Fortnite. It was released on December 6, 2018 for Microsoft Windows, macOS, PlayStation 4, Xbox One, iOS, Nintendo Switch, and Android.

Gameplay 
In the Fortnite meta-game, players can create structures on a private island and share them with up to 100 players (including the owner) for various multiplayer game modes with customizable rules.

Players can place, copy and paste, move and erase objects, including ground tiles, items, and game buildings. There are limits to the amount of structures on an island. Players place objects from a palette with items of their choosing. They can also choose to build from predetermined structures like buildings.

Fortnite Creative loads into a hub island from which other islands can be accessed (used to be able to but not anymore in the recent most update now), most prominently those deemed popular by Epic Games and in the community. Players have the option to play custom games where they can practice their skills, compete against friends, or play minigames. Each player can have up to four private islands that they can build on. In the game, players can walk, jump and fly. Players edit the world using a mobile phone that their character holds in the hand. Afte a minigame is played, the island is reset to its previous state before the game started.

The islands could previously be nominated to appear in The Block, a 25 × 25 tile area in Fortnite Battle Royale, which replaced Risky Reels in the top right corner of the map in Chapter 1 Season 7. In Chapter 1 Season 8 The Block was moved to the northwest of the map, replacing the motel. After 4 years, Fortnite has announced The Block 2.0 during Fortnite Chapter 3 Season 2. This is replacing Tilted Towers; which in the center of the map. Players created their versions of "The Block 2.0" in Creative.

Development 
During the development of Creative mode, Epic Games prioritized completing quickly over creating a perfect mode upon release. Because of this, there were several bugs upon release. Due to their focus on speed, Epic Games created the prefabs system, instead of the full selection of blocks seen in other creative mode games. Epic Games was able to launch Fortnite Creative earlier than planned. Epic has updated creative mode several times since it was launched, fixing bugs, adding new buildings, and new island types. A scoreboard was added during the 8.40 patch.

While Epic has used Fortnite: Battle Royale to perform a number of promotional events, such as virtual concerts, Epic partnered with Time to create a special Fortnite Creative area dedicated to celebrating the 58th anniversary of Martin Luther King Jr.'s "I Have a Dream" speech on August 28, 2021.

UEFN 
A revamped system of Fortnite Creative, known as Creative 2.0 (UEFN), was initially found in a presentation at Christmas 2020. Data leakers found them in early 2022. It is expected to feature unlocked scripting abilities such as programmable AI, importable animations, customizable HUDs, terrain generation, etc.

Creative 2.0 was originally planned to release by the end of 2022, but it was delayed. On March 16, 2023, it was announced that UEFN would arrive in the game on March 22, 2023 along with a tutorial on The State of Unreal.

This game also uses it creativity to honor special and rememberable events such as Christmas, Halloween, and creating the map to honor and remember the lives that were lost during the Ukraine war.

Release 
The game mode was announced on December 5, 2018. A trailer was released and Epic Games partnered with nine YouTubers to create demonstration videos of the meta-game. Fortnite Battle Royale season 7 battle pass owners were able to play the game starting December 6. Players without a battle pass could join islands created by players with a battle pass. The meta-game was released for all players on December 13, 2018.

Reception 
Fortnite Creative has been compared to the 2011 sandbox game Minecraft. Henry St Leger of TechRadar wrote that this Fortnite installment shies away from taking inspiration from the battle royale game PlayerUnknown's Battlegrounds towards taking inspiration from Minecraft. He called the meta-game "basically a blueprint" and wrote that it could become a "serious rival" to Minecraft due to Fortnite infrastructure and player base.

The meta-game was expected to keep a healthy player base for Fortnite. Polygon Ben Kuchera wrote that the game is "a powerful new tool" and that "[sharing] your own maps and game modes, or just using the tools to create wild videos, is going to go a long way toward keeping Fortnite fresh for the foreseeable future."

Players have recreated various structures in Fortnite Creative; these include the Star Wars starship Millennium Falcon and Castle Black from Game of Thrones. Others have used musical tiles (which can be found inside of the Creative Inventory) to perform songs popular as Internet memes. Maps from other video games such as Counter-Strike and Call of Duty have also been recreated in the meta-game by players. Locations and plots from TV shows and movies such as survival drama television series Squid Game have been recreated in the Creative gamemode.

Notes

References

External links 

2018 video games
Epic Games games
Free-to-play video games
Open-world video games
Video games developed in the United States
Unreal Engine games
Video games set on fictional islands
Video games with user-generated gameplay content
Creative